Rüştü Sakarya (1877 in Constantinople (Istanbul) – December 2, 1951) was an officer of the Ottoman Army and a general of the Turkish Army.

Medals and decorations
Order of Osminieh 3rd class
Order of Osmanieh with Sword
Medal of the Battle of Greece (Yunan Muharebe Madalyası)
Gallipoli Star (Ottoman Empire)
Silver Medal of Liyaqat
Silver Medal of Imtiyaz
Gold Medal of Liyaqat
Iron Cross 1st and 2nd class
Austria-Hungary Military Merit Medal (Austria-Hungary) 3rd Class
Medal of Independence with Red Ribbon

See also
List of high-ranking commanders of the Turkish War of Independence

Sources

External links

1877 births
1951 deaths
Military personnel from Istanbul
Turkish people of Circassian descent
Ottoman Military Academy alumni
Ottoman Army officers
Ottoman military personnel of the Greco-Turkish War (1897)
Ottoman military personnel of the Italo-Turkish War
Ottoman military personnel of the Balkan Wars
Ottoman military personnel of World War I
Ottoman prisoners of war
World War I prisoners of war held by the United Kingdom
Turkish military personnel of the Greco-Turkish War (1919–1922)
Turkish Army generals
Burials at Turkish State Cemetery
Recipients of the Silver Imtiyaz Medal
Recipients of the Gold Liakat Medal
Recipients of the Iron Cross (1914), 1st class
Recipients of the Medal of Independence with Red Ribbon (Turkey)